Leptotarsus costalis is an Australian species of crane fly in the family Tipulidae. A large insect with a narrow body and small head. The two  wings are held almost at right angles to the body. Legs and antennae are long. The rostrum is as long as the head. Body length to 1.5 cm.

References

Tipulidae
Insects described in 1787
Insects of Australia